Tai Chi Master may refer to:

 Zhang Sanfeng, the legendary master
 Tai Chi Master (TV series), a 1980 Hong Kong TV series
 Tai Chi Master (film), a 1993 film